Mohammad or Muhammad Nawaz may refer to:
Mohammad Nawaz (cricketer, born 1970), Pakistani first-class cricketer for Faisalabad and Sargodha
Mohammad Nawaz (cricketer, born 1974), Pakistani first-class cricketer for Faisalabad and Hyderabad
Mohammad Nawaz (cricketer), Pakistani cricketer (born 1994)
Mohammad Nawaz Sharif, Pakistani politician and three times elected Prime Minister
Muhammad Nawaz (general) (1957–2011), Pakistani general
Muhammad Nawaz Bhatti (1948–2006), Pakistani judge
Muhammad Nawaz Khan (politician), Pakistani politician
Muhammad Nawaz Khan (writer) (1943–2015), Pakistani writer
Muhammad Nawaz Abbasi (born 1943), former Pakistani judge
Mohammad Nawaz (footballer) (born 2000), Indian football goalkeeper